The Breathitt Formation is a geologic formation in Kentucky. It preserves fossils dating back to the Pennsylvanian period.

See also
 List of fossiliferous stratigraphic units in Kentucky

References

Carboniferous Kentucky
Carboniferous southern paleotropical deposits